The Fourpoints Bridge, near Emmitsburg, Maryland is a wrought iron bridge by the Wrought Iron Bridge Company of Canton, Ohio.  The bridge crosses Toms Creek and is similar to the Poffenberger Road Bridge elsewhere in Frederick County. The 103-foot Pratt truss bridge remains in daily use.

References

External links
, including photo in 2002, at Maryland Historical Trust

Road bridges on the National Register of Historic Places in Maryland
Wrought iron bridges in the United States
Bridges in Frederick County, Maryland
National Register of Historic Places in Frederick County, Maryland
Pratt truss bridges in the United States